The Mahaka Ponds are two ponds close together at the southern end of Conrad Ledge in The Fortress, in the Cruzen Range of Victoria Land. The New Zealand Geographic Board revised its 2005 decision of Greenfield Ponds to Mahaka Ponds in 2006. Mahaka is a Māori word meaning twin, which is a descriptive name for the two ponds in close proximity.

References

Landforms of Victoria Land